is a manga written in 1999 by Yusaku Hanakuma. It was subsequently made into a 2005 Japanese film written and directed by Sakichi Sato. The films stars Tadanobu Asano, Show Aikawa, and Erika Okuda. The movie was released in North America, UK and later Australia and New Zealand in 2009.

Plot
Fujio and Mitsuo are two full-time slackers who work in a fire extinguisher factory. The two spend their lunch hours training to fulfill their dreams of being jujitsu champions. One day, they murder their boss and dump his body on a Tokyo toxic waste dump known as "Black Fuji". Things suddenly become worse when an army of the undead rises from the waste dump and begin to attack the living. In order to survive, they will have to employ their limited jujitsu skills, to either help or escape Tokyo.

Film cast
Tadanobu Asano –  Fujio
Show Aikawa –  Mitsuo
Erika Okuda –  Yoko
Arata Furuta –  Ishihara
Kazuo Umezu –  Akiyama / Prince
Hina Matsuoka –  Fumiyo
Maria Takagi –  Yocchan's sister

Reception
In a list of "10 Great Zombie Manga", Anime News Network's Jason Thompson placed Tokyo Zombie in ninth place, calling it "good, cheesy, ultraviolent entertainment".

References

External links

1999 manga
2000s Japanese-language films
2005 horror films
Zombie comedy films
2005 films
Japanese horror films
Manga adapted into films
Live-action films based on manga
Zombies in anime and manga
Zombies in comics
2000s comedy horror films
2005 comedy films
Japanese zombie films
2000s Japanese films